The Holy Grail or San Graal tapestries are a set of six tapestries depicting scenes from the legend of King Arthur and the quest for the Holy Grail.  The tapestries were commissioned from Morris & Co. by William Knox D'Arcy in 1890 for his dining room at Stanmore Hall, outside London.  Additional versions of the tapestries with minor variations were woven on commission by Morris & Co. over the next decade.

The series

The six original tapestries illustrate the story of the Grail quest as told in Sir Thomas Malory's 1485 book Le Morte d'Arthur.  Like other Morris & Co. tapestries, the Holy Grail sequence was a group effort, with overall composition and figures designed by Edward Burne-Jones, heraldry by William Morris, and foreground florals and backgrounds by John Henry Dearle. The narrative panels were accompanied by smaller verdure or woodland panels featuring deer, the knights' shields hung on trees, and text telling the story of the panel hung above. The sequence was worked over a period of five years, from 1891 to 1894, at Merton Abbey.  The Attainment was the first of the series to be completed, and was shown at the Arts and Crafts Exhibition in 1893.

The six tapestries are:
 The Knights of the Round Table Summoned to the Quest by the Strange Damsel
 The Arming and Departure of the Knights
 The Failure of Sir Launcelot to enter the Chapel of the Holy Grail
 The Failure of Sir Gawaine: Sir Gawaine and Sir Uwaine at the Ruined Chapel
 The Ship
 The Attainment: The Vision of the Holy Grail to Sir Galahad, Sir Bors, and Sir Perceval (also known as The Achievement of the Grail or The Achievement of Sir Galahad, accompanied by Sir Bors, and Sir Perceval)

Textile historian Linda Parry wrote of the series "their design, decoration and weaving establish them, beyond doubt, as the most significant tapestry series woven in the nineteenth century."

The original set of tapestries remained at Stanmore Hall until D'Arcy's death in 1920.  They were subsequently sold and dispersed.  Morris & Co. wove a second subset of the narrative panels  in 1895 and 1896 for the drawing room at Compton Hall, Lawrence Hodson's seat near Wolverhampton.  A third complete set was woven for George McCulloch in 1898 and 1899.  Some hangings from these subsequent weavings are in the Birmingham Museum and Art Gallery. Others are in the collection of Andrew Lloyd Webber.  The Stanmore Hall weaving of The Attainment was purchased by guitarist Jimmy Page in 1978; the piece failed to meet its reserve at auction in 2008 and remains in Page's collection.

Gallery

Notes

References

Fairclough, Oliver and Emmeline Leary, Textiles by William Morris and Morris & Co. 1861–1940, Birmingham Museums and Art Gallery, 1981, 
Parry, Linda, ed., William Morris, Abrams, 1996, 
Parry, Linda, William Morris Textiles, New York, Viking Press, 1983, 
Wildman, Stephen: Edward Burne-Jones: Victorian Artist-Dreamer, Metropolitan Museum of Art, 1998, 
Wood, Christopher: Burne-Jones, Phoenix Illustrated, 1997,

External links
 "The Arras Tapestries of the San Graal at Stanmore Hall" from The Studio, Number 15, 1898.

Tapestries
1890s works
Morris & Co. tapestries
Arthurian art